The Shri Labhubhai Trivedi Institute of Engineering and Technology (SLTIET) is a technical institute located in Rajkot, India.

It was established in 2010. It is accredited by AICTE, and it is affiliated with the GTU.

The school is managed by Mahatma Gandhi Charitable Trust and offers Computer Science, Mechanical, Electrical and Civil Engineering courses.

References

External links
 

Education in Rajkot
Engineering colleges in Gujarat